King Arthur II: The Role-Playing Wargame is a real-time tactics and role-playing video game and a sequel to King Arthur: The Role-Playing Wargame, released online in Europe on September 20, 2011, and then worldwide in 2012. It was developed by NeocoreGames and published by Paradox Interactive. It blends elements of the real-time tactics, role-playing, and grand strategy genres into one.

Gameplay

Gameplay in King Arthur II is a mix of real-time strategy, role-playing, and grand strategy elements. The grand strategy portion of the game is played on a large campaign map of Britannia. Unlike its predecessor, King Arthur II does not feature multiplayer.

Plot

There are two campaigns in the game, a prologue with only one chapter, and the main story, spanning several chapters. In the prologue, the player takes the role of Septimus Sulla, heir to one of the Roman families that ruled in Britannia south of Hadrian's Wall. The prologue details Septimus' rise to power and eventual descent into madness.

In the main campaign, the player takes over the role of William Pendragon, son of the once and future King Arthur. Arthur lies mortally stricken by a magical curse and several of the figures of Arthurian legend are missing when William steps up to unite the provinces that once made up Arthur's kingdom, fight back the Fomorians unleashed by the Witch Queen Morgawse from the Orkney Islands and find a way to heal his father.

As in the previous game, other heroes join the army of William and, eventually, a second army led by the sorceress Morgana Le Fay becomes available as William allows her to search in the name of King Arthur for her mentor Merlin, who was kidnapped by the enchantress Lady Nimue. Over the course of the game, Septimus Sulla attacks from the North.

King Arthur II: Dead Legions
An expansion pack King Arthur II: Dead Legions was released on the same day in North America, while it was released in Japan on September 7, 2012.

Reception

The game received "average" reviews according to the review aggregation website Metacritic. From release, the game was plagued with various bugs. A string of patches were deployed to address these issues within days of release.

References

External links

2011 video games
Fantasy video games set in the Middle Ages
Real-time tactics video games
Role-playing video games
Turn-based strategy video games
Video games based on Arthurian legend
Video games based on Celtic mythology
Video games developed in Hungary
Video games featuring female protagonists
Windows-only games
Windows games
Paradox Interactive games
Video games using PhysX
Single-player video games
CyberFront games
NeocoreGames games